Black Down and Sampford Commons is a  biological Site of Special Scientific Interest in Devon and Somerset, notified in 1952.

The Little Breach reserve, which forms part of the SSSI is an area of heathy grassland on Greensand, with some blackthorn and birch, noted for its butterflies and moths.

Blackdown and Sampford Commons have the finest and most extensive surviving examples of the heathland, carr woodland and marshy grassland habitats that have developed on the acidic soils overlying the Greensand and Keuper Marls of the Blackdown Hills. The heathland supports a typical invertebrate fauna, including a wide variety of butterfly species, and with spiders notably abundant. The site is regionally important for birds which favour heathland habitats.

References 

Sites of Special Scientific Interest in Somerset
Sites of Special Scientific Interest notified in 1952